Jovan Santos-Knox (born July 5, 1994) is a professional Canadian football linebacker for the Ottawa Redblacks of the Canadian Football League (CFL). He played college football at UMass.

Professional career

Winnipeg Blue Bombers
Santos-Knox was signed by the Winnipeg Blue Bombers after driving nine hours with his father to a tryout camp which his father had found in Charlotte, North Carolina. He started his rookie season on special teams but by the end of the regular season was a starting linebacker and was being praised by coach Mike O'Shea and media for big plays at big moments of games. After recording 10 tackles and 3 sacks against Toronto on July 27, 2018, Santos-Knox was named the CFL's third star of the week.

Edmonton Eskimos
Santos-Knox spent the 2019 season with the Edmonton Eskimos where he played in three regular season games. After the CFL canceled the 2020 season due to the COVID-19 pandemic, he chose to opt-out of his contract with the Edmonton Eskimos on August 27, 2020.

Hamilton Tiger-Cats
On February 6, 2021, it was announced that Santos-Knox had signed with the Hamilton Tiger-Cats.

Ottawa Redblacks
On February 7, 2023, it was announced that Santos-Knox had signed with the Ottawa Redblacks.

References

1993 births
Living people
Winnipeg Blue Bombers players
Canadian football linebackers
American football linebackers
Players of American football from Connecticut
UMass Minutemen football players
American players of Canadian football
Sportspeople from Waterbury, Connecticut
Edmonton Elks players
Hamilton Tiger-Cats players
People from Middletown, Connecticut